Chubutophis is an extinct genus of boid snakes from the Eocene-aged Sarmiento Formation in Chubut Province, Argentina.  It is known from a partial set of vertebrae suggesting a juvenile individual. The type species is C. grandis.

Size 
According to Adriana Albino, the describing researcher,

Considering that this material is from a young specimen, its size is extraordinary and it is estimated that the adult would have reached greater dimensions than those observed in the largest snakes known up to the present, including Madtsoia and Gigantophis

References 

Boinae
Eocene snakes
Eocene reptiles of South America
Casamayoran
Paleogene Argentina
Fossils of Argentina
Fossil taxa described in 1993
Golfo San Jorge Basin
Sarmiento Formation